"I'm Not a Fool" is a song performed by IMx (then credited as Immature), issued as the lead single from their fourth studio album The Journey. The song peaked at #69 on the Billboard Hot 100 in 1997.

Chart positions

References

External links
 
 

1997 singles
IMx songs
MCA Records singles
Song recordings produced by Chris Stokes (director)
Songs written by Chris Stokes (director)